Don't Make Me Go is a 2022 American road trip film directed by Hannah Marks, written by Vera Herbert, and starring John Cho and Mia Isaac. It premiered at the Tribeca Film Festival on June 13, 2022, and was released on Amazon Prime Video on July 15, 2022.

Plot
After discovering that he has a terminal disease, a single father takes his reluctant teenage daughter on a cross country road trip to find her estranged mother, as he tries to teach her everything she might need to know for the rest of her life along the way.

Cast
 John Cho as Max Park
 Mia Isaac as Wally Park
 Kaya Scodelario as Annie
 Josh Thomson as Guy Connelly
 Otis Dhanji as Glenn
 Stefania LaVie Owen as Sandra
 Mitchell Hope as Rusty
 Jen Van Epps as Nicole
 Jemaine Clement as Dale Angelo
 Hannah Marks as Tessa

Production
The script written by Vera Herbert was on the 2012 Black List of the most-liked unproduced screenplays in Hollywood. The first draft was dated June 8, 2012, and it was originally titled A Story About My Father. On March 24, 2021, Amazon Studios signed on to develop the film, with Hannah Marks set to direct and Herbert writing and executive producing the film, with Donald De Line, Peter Saraf, and Leah Holzer producing.

On March 24, 2021, it was announced that John Cho had been cast in the film. On April 13, 2021, it was announced that Mia Isaac had joined the cast, and Kaya Scodelario joined the cast on August 13, 2021. The story was originally written for a White family, but the director, Hannah Marks felt that Cho was best suited for the role after seeing him in a previous father role in Searching. And after Isaac joined, Marks said, "We did adapt the script in certain areas to feel like it was customized to them."

Filming commenced in New Zealand in May 2021.

Release
The film premiered at the Tribeca Film Festival on June 13, 2022, and was released on Prime Video on July 15, 2022.

Reception
The film received mixed reviews from critics. Review aggregator website Rotten Tomatoes rated it 53% based on 60 reviews with an average rating of 5.8/10. The critical consensus reads, "John Cho and Mia Isaac are an appealing pair of leads, but Don't Make Me Go is one road trip movie that follows an overly familiar path."

Kate Erbland of IndieWire gave the film a B, calling it "a joy, heartbreaking and heartening in equal measure." Angie Han of The Hollywood Reporter called it "a solidly likable drama, anchored by lovely, lived-in chemistry between John Cho and Mia Isaac as a father-daughter duo," but added that "a misguided third-act choice throws off its bittersweet vibe, leaving a distinctly sour aftertaste." Michael Nordine of Variety also criticized the film's third act as "questionable."

References

External links
 

2022 adventure films
2022 comedy-drama films
2022 independent films
2020s adventure comedy-drama films
2020s American films
2020s English-language films
2020s road comedy-drama films
Amazon Studios films
American adventure comedy-drama films
American road comedy-drama films
Comedy-drama films about Asian Americans
Big Beach (company) films
Films about families
Films about father–daughter relationships
Films directed by Hannah Marks
Films produced by Donald De Line
Films shot in New Zealand
Films about Korean Americans